Waliou Jacques Daniel Isheola "Wally" Badarou (born 22 March 1955) is a French musician. Born in France with ancestry from Benin, West Africa, Badarou is known for his close association with the English group Level 42, and for his prolific work as a session musician with a wide variety of performers from around the world.

Biography
Badarou was the long-time associate of the British band Level 42, contributing on keyboards, synthesizers and programming. He has co-written and performed on a number of the band's tracks since their recording début in 1980, later co-producing them.

Though never an official member of Level 42, he could be considered a de facto "fifth member" of the band's classic line-up from 1980 through 1994, as he played keyboards and synths on all their studio albums, and co-wrote and/or co-produced much of their material.  However, Badarou did not play with Level 42 on concert dates, and he has not been involved with the revived version of the group, which reunited in the early 2000s.

Badarou was close to Island Records's founder Chris Blackwell, and he was one of the Compass Point All Stars (with Sly and Robbie, Barry Reynolds, Mikey Chung and Uziah "Sticky" Thompson), the in-house recording team of Compass Point Studios responsible for a long series of albums of the 1980s recorded by Grace Jones, Tom Tom Club, Joe Cocker, Mick Jagger, Black Uhuru, Gwen Guthrie, Jimmy Cliff and Gregory Isaacs.

Badarou's keyboard playing could also be heard on albums by Robert Palmer, Marianne Faithfull, Herbie Hancock, M (Pop Muzik), Talking Heads, Foreigner, Power Station, Melissa Etheridge, Manu Dibango and Miriam Makeba.

He produced albums by Fela Kuti, Salif Keita, Wasis Diop, Trilok Gurtu, Carlinhos Brown; wrote for the films Countryman, and Kiss of the Spider Woman; plus directed and wrote for Jean-Paul Goude's French Bicentennial parade, Bastille Day 1989.

His solo instrumental work includes two albums: Echoes (1984) and Words of a Mountain (1989). The former included "Chief Inspector", "Mambo" (sampled for Massive Attack's "Daydreaming" (Blue Lines  album)), and "Hi-Life". "Chief Inspector" peaked at #46 in the UK Singles Chart in October 1985.

The Words of a Mountain album is believed to be one of the first fully tapeless recordings in contemporary/new-age history: co-pioneering the computerised home studio concept with other electronic musicians of his generation, Badarou established a reputation on the field with his extensive use of Sequential Circuits Prophet 5, New England Digital Synclavier, and custom voice-controlled Yamaha digital mixers.

Badarou also helped organise the Kora All Africa Music Awards in 1997, while co-writing and producing So Why, a charity album for the ICRC, conceived as a call against ethnic cleansing in Africa, featuring Youssou N'Dour and Papa Wemba.

He has embraced stage acting since the early 2000s, showing interest in aviation, movies, science-fiction and philosophy.

By the end of 2009, starting with Fisherman, a 15 mn long "marathon in afro-beat territory ", Badarou released his latest album (The Unnamed Trilogy): online exclusively, one single at a time, via the JukeSticker, a direct and sharable transaction tool: "At very long last, my fans are to receive the music that never stopped haunting me all these years. The whole of it will be available as a physical collector set, once the three albums are fully revealed ".

Discography

Solo
1979: Back to Scales Tonight
1984: Echoes
1985: Chief Inspector (EP)
1989: Words of a Mountain
1997: So Why
2001: Colors of Silence : Musical poetry for Yoga
2009: The Unnamed Trilogy

Movie scores
1981: Dickie Jobson: Countryman
1982: Nathalie Delon & Yves Deschamps: They Call It an Accident
1985: Hector Babenco: Kiss of the SpiderWoman (additional music)
1991: Lol Creme: The Lunatic
1997: Idrissa Ouedraogo: Kini & Adams
1997: Don Letts & Rick Elgood: DanceHall Queen
1999: Chris Browne: Third World Cop
2000: John Berry: Boesman & Lena

Producer (and co-producer)
1979: Janic Prévost – J'veux d'la Tendresse
1981: Alain Chamfort – Amour Année Zéro
1983: Marianne Faithfull – A Child's Adventure (& co-writer)
1985: Level 42 – World Machine (& co-writer)
1986: Alain Chamfort – Tendres Fièvres (& co-writer)
1986: Fela Anikulapo Kuti – Teacher Don't Teach Me Nonsense
1987: Level 42 – Running in the Family (& co-writer)
1988: Level 42 – Staring at the Sun (& co-writer)
1990: Level 42 – Guaranteed (& co-writer)
1993: Level 42 – Forever Now (& co-writer)
1995: Salif Keita – Folon
1996: Carlinhos Brown – AlfaGamaBetizado
1998: Yannick Noah & Zam Zam – Zam Zam
1998: Wasis Diop – Toxu
2000: Trilok Gurtu  -The Beat of Love (& co-writer)
2001: i Muvrini – Umani

Session player
1979: M – New-York, London, Paris, Munich ("Pop Muzik")
1979: Miriam Makeba – Comme une symphonie d'amour
1980: Bernie Lyon – Bernie Lyon
1980: Grace Jones – Warm Leatherette
1980: M – The Official Secrets Act
1980: Lizzy Mercier Descloux – Mambo Nassau
1980: Level 42 – The Early Tapes (& co-writer)
1981: Grace Jones – Nightclubbing
1981: Level 42 – Level 42 (& co-writer)
1981: Bernie Lyon – I'm Living in the Sunshine
1981: Gibson Brothers – Quartier Latin
1981: Barry Reynolds – I Scare Myself
1981: Will Tura – Tura 81
1981: Jimmy Cliff – Give The People What They Want
1982: Charlélie Couture – Pochette Surprise
1982: Joe Cocker – Sheffield Steel
1982: Black Uhuru – Chill Out
1982: Gregory Isaacs – Night Nurse
1982: Grace Jones – Living My Life
1982: Gwen Guthrie – Gwen Guthrie
1982: Robin Scott & Shikisha – Jive Shikisha !
1982: Level 42 – The Pursuit of Accidents (& co-writer)
1983: Level 42 – Standing in the Light (& co-writer)
1983: Talking Heads – Speaking in Tongues
1983: Tom-Tom Club – Close to the Bone
1984: Level 42 – True Colours (& co-writer)
1984: Foreigner – Agent Provocateur
1985: Mick Jagger – She's The Boss
1985: Power Station – Some Like It Hot
1985: Level 42 – World Machine
1985: Gwen Guthrie – Just For You
1985: Sly & Robbie – Language Barrier
1985: Robert Palmer – Riptide
1988: Manu Dibango – Electric Africa
1988: Melissa Etheridge – Melissa Etheridge
1988: Talking Heads – Naked
1988: Julio Iglesias – Libra
1994: Power Station – Living in Fear
2008: Grace Jones – Hurricane
2009: Phil Gould – Watertight

Bibliography

 Melissa Chemam, "Massive Attack: Out of the Comfort Zone", Tangent Books,  (2019).

See also
List of ambient music artists

References

External links
Official website
Wally Badarou discography
www.cosmicdisco.co.uk 'The Prophet Speaks' Exclusive Wally Badarou Interview
Wally Badarou RBMA video lecture session

1955 births
Living people
Level 42 members
Tom Tom Club members
Beninese musicians
French keyboardists
French people of Beninese descent
Island Records artists